Grevillea intricata is a species of flowering plant in the family Proteaceae and is endemic to the west of Western Australia. It is a densely-branched shrub with tangled branchlets, divided leaves with linear lobes and clusters of pale greenish-white to light cream-coloured flowers.

Description

Taxonomy
Grevillea intricata was first formally described by botanist Carl Meissner in Hooker's Journal of Botany and Kew Garden Miscellany based on material collected by James Drummond. The specific epithet (intricata) means "entangled".

Distribution and habitat
This grevillea grows in heath, or tall shrubland and mallee shrubland between Northampton, Ajana and the Chapman East River in the Geraldton Sandplains bioregion in the west of Western Australia.

Conservation status
Grevillea intricata is listed as "not threatened" by the Government of Western Australia Department of Biodiversity, Conservation and Attractions.

References

intricata
Eudicots of Western Australia
Proteales of Australia
Taxa named by Carl Meissner
Plants described in 1855